Golif may refer to:

Golif 21, a French sailboat design
Louis Le Golif, a fictional French pirate